National Chao-Chou Senior High School (CCSH) is a national high school in Chaozhou Township, Pingtung County, Taiwan Province, Republic of China.

Introduction History 
This school was founded in March 1942, formerly known as Chaochou Shude Girl's School (潮州淑德女學校), and held the opening ceremony at 23, May, 1942. In 1944, the school was renamed as Chaochou Girls' Agriculture and Vocational School (潮州農業實踐女學校). At February 1946, the school name was changed to Chaochou Middle School of Kaohsiung County (高雄縣立潮州初級中學). In 1949, the school was called Taiwan Provincial Chaochou Middle/High School (台灣省立潮州中學), and added high school education. Since 1968, the department of junior high school was faded away year after year. In July 1970 was renamed as Taiwan Provincial Chaochou High School (台灣省立潮州高級中學). After the downsizing of the provincial government at 2000, the school was being named as National Chao Chou Senior High School (國立潮州高級中學).

Former Principal

Before the Retrocession of Taiwan

After the Retrocession of Taiwan

Facilities and campus 
淑德樓
Education, Science, Culture Center(教科文中心)
明德樓
Academic Building(教學大樓)
Home Economics Building(家政大樓)
Physical Fitness Center(體適能中心)
中興堂
校史館
Swimming Pool(游泳池)

Notable alumni
 Julia Peng
 陳綺萱Sophia（singer）

Transportation
The school is accessible within walking distance from Chaozhou Station of Taiwan Railways.

See also
 Education in Taiwan

External links

潮州高中 
教中辦-潮州高中簡介 
National Chaochou Senior High School 

Educational institutions established in 1942
High schools in Taiwan
Schools in Pingtung County
1942 establishments in Taiwan